Walter V of Brienne (– 15 March 1311) was Duke of Athens from 1308 until his death. Being the only son of Hugh of Brienne and Isabella de la Roche, Walter was the heir to large estates in France, the Kingdom of Naples, and the Peloponnese. He was held in custody in the Sicilian castle of Augusta between 1287 and 1296 or 1297 to secure the payment of his father's ransom to the Aragonese admiral Roger of Lauria. When his father died fighting against Lauria in 1296, Walter inherited the County of Brienne in France, and the counties of Lecce and Conversano in southern Italy. He was released, but he was captured during a Neapolitan invasion of Sicily in 1299. His second captivity lasted until the Treaty of Caltabellotta in 1302.

Walter settled in France and married Joanna of Châtillon. After his cousin Duke Guy II of Athens died childless in 1308, Walter laid claim to the Duchy of Athens. Their cousin Eschiva of Ibelin also claimed the duchy, but the High Court of Achaea passed a judgement in Walter's favor. Walter came to Athens in 1309. John II Doukas, the Greek lord of Thessaly, made an alliance against him with the Byzantine Empire and the Despotate of Epirus. Walter hired the Catalan Company, a group of mercenaries, to invade Thessaly. The Catalans defeated John, but Walter refused to pay their wages. After the Catalans rose up in open rebellion, Walter assembled a large army from Frankish Greece, but the Catalans inflicted a crushing defeat on the Franks in the Battle of Halmyros. Walter died in the battlefield and the Catalans occupied the Duchy of Athens.

Early life 

Born around 1275, Walter was the only son of Hugh of Brienne and Isabella de la Roche. Hugh held important fiefs both in France (the county of Brienne), and in southern Italy (the counties of Lecce and Conversano). He had also claimed Cyprus, but the Cypriots elected his cousin Hugh of Antioch-Lusignan as king. Isabella de la Rochethe younger daughter of Duke Guy I of Athensbrought Peloponnesian estates into the marriage. She died in 1279.

Historian Guy Perry describes Walter as a "veritable child" of the War of the Sicilian Vespers (1282–1302). His father, who was a military commander of King Charles II of Naples, fell into captivity in the Battle of the Counts on 23 June 1287. Hugh was released only after he ceded Walter as a hostage to the Aragonese admiral, Roger of Lauria, to guarantee the payment of his ransom. Walter was kept in the fortress at Augusta for years. He most probably learnt Catalan and became familiar with the Aragonese customs during the years of his captivity.

Walter was still held in custody when his father died fighting against Lauria at Brindisi in the summer of 1296. King Charles II ordered Hugh's southern Italian vassals to swear fealty to Walter on 27 August. After being released, Walter went to France and took possession of his father's French domains. He was invested with the County of Brienne before May 1297.

Warlike aristocrat 

Seeking revenge for his father's death, Walter made an alliance with two French noblemen whose fathers had also been murdered in Italy. They hired 300 horsemen, who were known as the "Knights of Death", and joined the army that Charles II's heir, Robert, Duke of Calabria, had mustered to invade Sicily. Robert and his troops landed at Catania and occupied the town. Before long, rumours reached the Neapolitan camp, hinting that the castellan of Gagliano Castelferrato was willing to capitulate without resistance. Robert dispatched Walter and his retainers to the fortress to start negotiations with the castellan. The rumours proved false, deliberately spread to trap Neapolitan troops. After realizing the situation, Walter refused to flee and did battle against the Aragonese troops, but he was soon forced to surrender. Charles II appointed Philip of Toucy to administer Walter's southern Italian domains during his captivity. After the Treaty of Caltabellotta was signed in 1302, ending the War of the Sicilian Vespers, Walter was released. He went to France before June 1303. His subsequent marriage to Joanna of Châtillon, the daughter of the constable of France, strengthened his position in France.

Duke of Athens 
On 5 October 1308, the duke of Athens, Guy II, died childless. His two cousins, Walter and Eschiva of Ibelin, laid claim to the duchy. Eschiva was the daughter of Alice de la Roche, who was the elder sister of Walter's mother, but the High Court of the Principality of Achaea—the feudal suzerain of Athens—ruled in Walter's favor, saying that the male claimant was to be preferred against a female if two relatives of equal degree claimed an inheritance. Before departing for Athens, Walter appointed his father-in-law, Gaucher V de Châtillon, to administer the County of Brienne.

Walter landed at Glarentza in Achaea in the summer of 1309. By the time he reached Athens, John II Doukas, ruler of Thessaly, had got rid of Athenian suzerainty. The Byzantine emperor Andronikos II Palaiologos, and the actual ruler of Epirus, Anna Palaiologina Kantakouzene, supported John II, forcing Walter to seek external assistance. The Catalan Companya group of unemployed mercenarieshad made regular raids against Thessaly since 1305. Walter hired the Catalans and their Turkish allies to fight against the Greek rulers. The mercenaries invaded Thessaly and occupied important fortresses. After six months, John II was forced to sue for peace.

Walter owed the mercenaries four months' salaries, but he did not want to pay the arrears. He selected 200 horsemen and 300 almogàvars (lightly-armed foot soldiers) from among the Catalans and promised only to them to pay their wages. He also offered fiefs to them and ordered all other Catalans to leave the duchy. The dismissed mercenaries refused to move and requested Walter to allow them to settle in the newly conquered lands as his vassals. Walter did not trust the Catalans and threatened them with capital punishment if they did not obey his commands. Having nowhere else to go, the disbanded mercenaries rose up in open rebellion. The 500 Catalan mercenaries whom Walter had just hired joined their compatriots, forcing Walter to seek assistance from Achaea and other parts of Frankish Greece.

Walter's army met the Catalans in a marshy plain at Halmyros on 15 March 1311. The Catalans were willing to make peace, but Walter was determined to get rid of them. At the ensuing Battle of Halmyros, the Catalans won a devastating victory, killing Walter and almost all of his cavalry. The Catalans occupied the Duchy of Athens, and Walter's son, who was taken to Italy after the Catalans' victory, made unsuccessful attempts to regain it in the following decades. A Turkish soldier decapitated Walter's corpse and took his head in triumph from the battlefield. His son seized Walter's severed head and buried it in Lecce, most probably in the church of Sant'Oronzo, in 1348.

Genealogical table 

 

 
 

In the year 1306 he married Jeanne de Châtillon and had two children:
 Walter VI of Brienne (1302–1356), his successor as count of Lecce and Conversano, as well as the titular duke of Athens
 Isabella of Brienne (died 1360), married Gautier III, lord of Enghien, and claimed her brother's title to Lecce and Conversano on his death.

References

Sources

External links 
 

1270s births
1311 deaths
Dukes of Athens
Counts of Brienne
Counts of Lecce
Monarchs killed in action
French people of Cypriot descent
House of Brienne
Lords of Argos and Nauplia
14th-century rulers in Europe
13th-century French people
14th-century French people